"Puppet on a String" is a song recorded by British singer Sandie Shaw. Shaw won the contest, the first of the United Kingdom's five Eurovision winners. As her thirteenth UK single release, "Puppet on a String" became a UK Singles Chart number one hit on 27 April 1967, staying at the top for a total of three weeks. In the United States, a 1967 version by Al Hirt went to number 18 on the Adult Contemporary chart and No. 129 on the Billboard Hot 100.

Eurovision Song Contest
She had never been taken with the idea of taking part in the contest but her discoverer, Adam Faith, had talked her into it, saying it would keep her manager Eve Taylor happy. Taylor wanted to give Shaw a more cabaret appeal and felt that this was the right move – and also felt that it would get Shaw back in the public's good books as she had recently been involved in a divorce scandal.

Of the five songs performed, "Puppet on a String" was Shaw's least favourite. In her own words, "I hated it from the very first 'oompah' to the final 'bang' on the big bass drum. I was instinctively repelled by its sexist drivel and cuckoo-clock tune." She was disappointed when it was selected as the song she would use to represent the country, but it won the contest hands down, though it has always been felt that this was partly due to her existing popularity on the continent (she had recorded most of her hit singles in French, Italian, German and Spanish). As a result, "Puppet on a String" became her third number one hit in the UK (a record for a woman at the time) and was a big worldwide smash. In West Germany, the single was the biggest seller of the entire year, reaching sales of over 1 million copies. Globally, the single achieved sales in excess of 4 million, making it the biggest-selling winning Eurovision track to date. Some estimates suggest this makes the track the biggest selling single by a British female artist of all time. Shaw also recorded "Puppet on a String" in French ("Un tout petit pantin"), Italian ("La danza delle note"), Spanish ("Marionetas en la cuerda"), and German ("Wiedehopf im Mai").

Re-recording
Shaw re-recorded "Puppet on a String" in early 2007 to mark her 60th birthday. The recording took place after Shaw has visited her friend, the musician Howard Jones, and found him playing some chords on his keyboard and humming a melody. He encouraged her to continue the melody and before long she realised that it was in fact "Puppet on a String". They recorded a new, slow-tempo electronic version of the song and sent it to producer/mixer Andy Gray who put the final touches on the song. Shaw stated that she loved the new version (having spent a great deal of her life hating the original) and released it exclusively for free download from her official website, and Jones's, on 26 February (Shaw's birthday). It was available for free download for 60 days. As a result of its popularity, Shaw continued to put out new songs on her website for download for the remaining months of her 61st year.

Other covers
The song was covered in over 200 versions in over 30 languages.

Bulgarian: "Kukla na kontsi", by Margarita Radinska
Chinese:
Betty Chung
Singaporean singer Lara Tan
 Malaysian singer Sakura Teng
Dutch: "Speelbal in de wind" ("Beachball in the wind") by Reggy van der Burgt, later by Anneke Grönloh
Estonian: "Hüpiknukk", by Heli Lääts (1967), transl. by Heldur Karmo
Finnish: "Sätkynukke", by Maarja-Leena Hentunen (single, Philips PF 340 791)
 Hungarian: "Paprikajancsi" (1967), by Zsuzsa Koncz
 Lithuanian: "Lele", by Violeta Riaubiskyte
 Norwegian: "Sprellemann" (1967), by Bente Aaseth with lyrics by Juul Hansen, under His Master's Voice
 Polish: "Ale Marionetka" ("What a puppet"), by Halina Kunicka
 Portuguese: "Marionette" (1967), by Simone de Oliveira; "Feira Popular" (1990), by Ana Faria and children/teenpop group Onda Choc, on their eighth album with the same title
 Russian: "Ya ne kukla" ("I am Not a Puppet"; 1968), by Emil Gorovets
 Serbian: "Marioneta" ("Marionette", 1967), by Sanjalice
 Slovak: "Ako malý psík" ("Like a puppy", 1967), by Tatjana Hubinská (0130166 Supraphon, mono); released on the day after the Eurovision Song Contest Ako malý psík was also covered by Jana Procházková
 Spanish: "Marionetas en la cuerda" (1967), by Lea Zafrani with the same lyrics as Shaw's, witten by Manuel Clavero
 Swedish: "Sprattelgumma" (1967), by Siw Malmkvist
 Tamil: by Nantha Balan Selvanayagam (1969).

Covers not translated into another language include:
Mantovani's instrumental version, included in the 1968 release The Mantovani Touch
the rocksteady version by Ken Boothe under the Studio One label
Lady Marmalade's version entitled "Puppet on a String (Blueboy Remix)"
Dutch group Mrs. Einstein's English-language version, released just after appearing in the Eurovision Song Contest 1997.

In popular culture
The song was featured in The 1975 Bulgarian Cartoon Buffo-Synchronists by Proiko Proikov and the soundtrack of the 2021 film Last Night in Soho.

Charts

References

External links
Sandie Shaw personal website

1967 singles
Songs written by Bill Martin (songwriter)
Eurovision songs of the United Kingdom
Songs written by Phil Coulter
Sandie Shaw songs
Pinky and Perky songs
Eurovision songs of 1967
Eurovision Song Contest winning songs
UK Singles Chart number-one singles
Number-one singles in Germany
Number-one singles in Norway
Irish Singles Chart number-one singles
Number-one singles in Austria
Number-one singles in New Zealand
Dutch Top 40 number-one singles
Pye Records singles
1967 songs